Hymenobacter daeguensis is a Gram-negative, rod-shaped, non-spore-forming, aerobic and non-motile bacterium from the genus of Hymenobacter which has been isolated from water from the Han River in Korea.

References 

daeguensis
Bacteria described in 2017